Ottilia (minor planet designation: 401 Ottilia) is a large main-belt asteroid. It was discovered by Max Wolf on March 16, 1895, in Heidelberg. It is named after the Germanic folkloric character Ottilia.

The semi-major axis of the orbit of 401 Ottilia lies just outside the 2/1 Kirkwood gap, located at 3.27 AU. 401 Ottilia is part of the Cybele asteroid group.

References

External links 
 
 

000401
Discoveries by Max Wolf
Named minor planets
18950316